Lewis Wetzel Wildlife Management Area (WMA) is located in Wetzel County, West Virginia, USA, about  south of Jacksonburg on County Route 82. The WMA second growth mixed hardwoods and hemlock with a thick understory of mountain laurel and rhododendron.

The wildlife management area and Wetzel County are named for Lewis Wetzel, an early settler and frontiersman in this area of West Virginia.

Hunting and fishing
Hunting opportunities include deer, grouse, raccoon, squirrel and turkey.

Fishing opportunities on the South Fork of Fishing Creek can include smallmouth bass, spotted bass and trout.  County Route 20 follows the South Fork of Fishing Creek.

Rustic camping is available seasonally in the WMA. A  shooting range is also available.

See also

Animal conservation
Camping
Fishing
Hunting
List of West Virginia wildlife management areas

References

External links
West Virginia DNR District 1 Wildlife Management Areas
West Virginia Hunting Regulations
West Virginia Fishing Regulations
WVDNR map of Lewis Wetzel Wildlife Management Area

Campgrounds in West Virginia
Protected areas of Wetzel County, West Virginia
Wildlife management areas of West Virginia
IUCN Category V